Blunt Youth Radio Project is one of the oldest and most decorated youth media programs in the United States. It's a weekly, youth produced public affairs radio show on WMPG in Portland, Maine. The hour-long show features two teen hosts who interview guests on topical issues. The team's reporters produce public-radio-style features to expand on the week's theme. Topics range from the serious: the genocide in Darfur - to the light-hearted: teen dating.

Mission
The mission of Blunt Youth Radio Project is youth empowerment through direct media access.

History
Claire Holman founded the program in response to a dearth of outlets for youth voices. Blunt's first show aired in July 1994. The show has aired weekly ever since without a rerun.

Training
All participants in the program receive free training in hosting, reporting, engineering, and digital audio production.

Current members
The project is led by Claire Holman.

Members include:

 Aidan Mitchell
 Setareh Jalali
 Sophie Frantz
 Milena Germon
 Moses Small
 Malcolm Purington
 Zoe Farr
 Jenni Nguyen
 Alice Kenny
 Elle Spurr
 John Adil

Outreach
In addition to Blunt's station-based after school program, Blunt has two off site production centers.

Blunt at Kennedy Park
In partnership with youth entrepreneurs, YOUTHINK and the People's Regional Opportunity Program (PROP), Blunt built community based production studio in Portland's Kennedy Park Peer Leader Program site.

Incarcerated Youth Speak Out
Blunt staff teach a radio production course twice weekly at the Long Creek Youth Development Center, a juvenile correctional facility in South Portland, Maine. Every eight weeks, the participants in our program make a supervised visit to WMPG to broadcast their own work - live.

Awards

Presented by the National Federation of Community Broadcasters
 2005 Silver Reel - Local Public Affairs - Adam, Branden, James, George, Lashanda, Tyler, Zack, Kerry Seed and Claire Holman - Incarcerated Youth Speak Out
 2003 Special Merit Award - Local News and Commentaries - Carolyn Snell - Body Image
 2003 Silver Reel Award - National Documentary - American Road Trip
 2003 Silver Reel Award - Radio Drama - Kathleen Ross - And How Does that Make You Feel?
 2002 Special Merit - Pre-produced Local Affairs Programming - Joey Thompson - Joey Interviews a Cutter
 2001 Silver Reel Award - Live Local Affairs Programming - Selena Juneau, Justin Vogel, Sarah Margolis-Pineo - High School Proms: From Dress Shopping to the Anti-Prom
 2001 Golden Reel - Promotion - Blunt Promo Sampler
 1998 Special Merit - Station Promo - Blunt Show Promos
 1998 Golden Reel - Public Affairs Programming - Blunt Telescope Excerpts

Presented by the Maine Association of Broadcasters
 2005 Radio News Award - First Place - Feature - Mark Cassette and Kerry Seed - My Criminal Life
 1999 Radio News Award - Second Place - Feature - Julie Joy, Jon Merrfield, Dan Kramer, Claire Holman - Students with Disabilities
 1998 Radio News Award - First Place - Feature - Bethany Marchand, Claire Holman - High School Student Explores Sex Industry

See also
 Youth voice
 Youth empowerment
 Civic engagement

External links
Blunt's site
Blunt on PRX
Blunt on Flickr

American public radio programs
Youth-led media